Ariel S. Tabag (born August 16, 1978), is a bilingual Ilocano fiction author (he writes in Ilocano language and Tagalog/Filipino), poet, editor, translator, and musician. He has received the Palanca Awards for his Ilokano short stories. He has also been awarded the Talaang Ginto-Gantimpalang Collantes. He has received awards from Ilocano literary contests such as AMMAFLA, GUMIL California, SABALI, RFAAFIL, ATILA, Tugade Awards. He is the author of Karapote (Curion), an anthology of Ilocano short stories. Tabag is also a fellow to the 41st UP National Writers Workshop (2002).

As a musician, he plays bass guitar for the underground band Pilo and the Ilocano rock band Manong Diego (formerly Samtoy). With Mighty C. Rasing, another Ilocano writer-musician, they started Danirock, a poetry performance with rock music.

Works
 Graphic Novels: "Mangmangkik in Da City" (2006), "Aggay, ti Maingel iti Cagay-an" (2010)
 Anthologies/Translations: "29 a Napili a Sarita iti Iluko" (2010), "Kastoy nga Imbunubonmi Dagiti Balikas" (2010), "Nabalitokan a Tawid" (2011), "Karapote, Antolohia Dagiti 13 a Nasuerte a Sarita" (2011), "Samtoy, Ang Aming Mga Kuwento" (2011), "Alimpatok, Antolohia Dagiti Erotiko a Daniw Dagiti Ilokano (2012)
 Short Stories: "Dung-aw," "Sudario," "1001 a Kalsada iti Siudad," "Eman," "Dagiti Samiweng ti Angin," "Maris ti Birhen," "Littugaw," "'Tom & Jerry'," Dagiti Ayup iti Bantay Quimmallugong," “Tapingaran," "Voice Tape," "Karapote," "Riting," "Ti Balay," "Saddam," "Taraqui," Ti Mision ni Asiong," “'Ninoy'"

Awards
 Talaang Ginto-Gantimpalang Collantes, Komisyon sa Wikang Filipino
 Reynald F. Antonio Awards for Iluko Literature (RFAAFIL)

References
 Facebook profile of Ariel S. Tabag
 Pakarso ni Asseng blog

Ilocano-language writers
Tagalog-language writers
Filipino male short story writers
Filipino short story writers
Palanca Award recipients
1978 births
Living people
Ilocano people